Grafenau is the name of two German towns
 Grafenau, Bavaria, a city in the district Freyung-Grafenau
 Grafenau, Württemberg, a municipality in the district of Böblingen, Baden-Württemberg